Leonides "Leo" Díaz Urbina (born October 6, 1962) is a Puerto Rican lawyer and politician who served as a legislator in the 24th and 25th House of Representatives of Puerto Rico, and as president of the New Progressive Party of Puerto Rico (PNP) in 2001. Diaz, was candidate for mayor of San Juan in 2016.

Biography
Díaz Urbina was born in San Juan, Puerto Rico, where his father, Leonides Díaz, was the owner of a grocer's shop and his mother, Gilberta Urbina Guzmán, a housewife.  He has a bachelor's degree in social sciences with a minor in political science from the University of Puerto Rico, Rio Piedras Campus and a juris doctor from the University of Puerto Rico School of Law.

In 1987, he was elected president of the National Association of Law Students, Rio Piedras Chapter. He was also elected as president of the student council for the University of Puerto Rico School of Law.

In 1990, he was elected as municipal legislator for the municipal legislative assembly of San Juan, as president of the New Progressive Party of Puerto Rico for the representative district III of San Juan, and as president of the Republican Party for the same district.

In 1992, he was elected as a Representative for the same district in the 1992 general election. He was sworn on January 11, 1993, effectively becoming an official member of the 24th House of Representatives of Puerto Rico. As a member of the 24th House, Díaz Urbina presided the  Commission of the Civil and Judiciary (now simply called the House of Representatives of Puerto Rico Commission of the Judiciary|Commission of the Judiciary) and the Commission for the Development of San Juan (now called the House of Representatives of Puerto Rico Commission on Integrated Development of the Capital City|Commission on Integrated Development of the Capital City).

In 1996, he was elected as a representative at-large in the 1996 general election. He was sworn on January 13, 1997, effectively becoming an official member of the 25th House of Representatives of Puerto Rico.

In 1999, he decided to no longer run for the House of Representatives but publicly supported and campaigned for Carlos Pesquera, then gubernatorial candidate for the New Progressive Party. In 2001, after Pesquera lost, he was elected President of the New Progressive Party, although he was later succeeded by Pesquera, who was one of the NPP candidates in the 2004 elections.

Diaz, was candidate for mayor of San Juan in 2016.

Personal life
Díaz Urbina married Zulma Ivelisse Fuster Troche, a prosecutor for the district of San Juan, in 1997. They have three children, Leonides Sebastián (born in 2000) and Patricia Victoria (born in 2001), and Isabella Cristina (born in 2006).

Notes

References

External links
 Facebook Page
 Twitter - @leodiazurbina

New Progressive Party members of the House of Representatives of Puerto Rico
Presidents of the New Progressive Party (Puerto Rico)
1962 births
Living people
Puerto Rican party leaders
University of Puerto Rico alumni